Ishaq Hussaini is an Indian actor who has worked in Tamil language films.

Career
The brother of karate expert Shihan Hussaini, Ishaq Hussaini also has a third degree black belt in karate. In an interview to The Hindu, Ishaaq revealed that he had gained a doctorate in literature from the City University, Los Angeles and that his Ph.D. thesis was a comparative study of French and English literature in the Romantic age. Ishaq Hussaini appeared in a series of films in the late 1990s and early 2000s, often scripting and producing his own films. After getting an average response to Jayam (1999) where he portrayed a supporting role with Mansoor Ali Khan, he reunited with the same director duo, Ravi Raja, to make the family drama film, Kanmani Unakkaga (1999) starring opposite actress Suvalakshmi. Despite the low profile releases, Ishaq opted to continue his acting career in Chennai and signed up to act in films titled Kaadhal Jeyikkum and Sagotharaa in 2000, but the films did not release. After appearing with actress Abitha in the romantic drama Poove Pen Poove (2001), he collaborated again with Ravi-Raja for the film Idhayamae, which released in 2003, and a further time for Iyappa Saamy co-starring Pandiarajan.

A film titled Nenjirukkumvarai Ninaivirukkum featuring Hussaini alongside Livingston and Shilpa Sivakumar was shot during 2003 and censored in 2008 but failed to have a theatrical release, before being later released straight to video. In the mid 2000s, he also worked on a film titled Boogambam, but the film did not materialise. A bilingual film titled Lemon began work in 2005 and was scheduled to have a release in 2012 after several delays.

Alongside his career in films, he was based out of Poland and set up the International American School of Warsaw. He is married to Yola and has a daughter, Greta, who is a doctor in Rhode Island, USA.

Filmography

References 

Living people
20th-century Indian male actors
Male actors in Tamil cinema
Indian male film actors
Male actors from Tamil Nadu
1973 births
21st-century Indian male actors